The 1st Open Russian Festival of Animated Film was held in 1996 at a boarding house called "Birch Grove" near the town of Tarusa, Russia. Because of the extreme scarcity of Russian animation in the post-perestroika era, submissions from the last three years were accepted. Along with auteur films, commercial reels, video clips and television bumpers were allowed.

Jury

Prizes of the Jury

Rating (by audience vote)

External links
Official website with the results

Open Russian Festival of Animated Film
Open Russian Festival of Animated Film
1996 in animation
Russ
Russ
Russ
Recurring events
Recurring events established in 1996